The 26th Lambda Literary Awards were held on June 2, 2014, to honour works of LGBT literature published in 2013. The list of nominees was released on March 6.

The ceremony was held at Cooper Union, in conjunction with Book Expo America.

Special awards

Nominees and winners

References

Lambda Literary Awards
Lambda
Lists of LGBT-related award winners and nominees
2014 in LGBT history
Lambda